Mikhail Korshuk (born 22 September 1969) is a Belarusian badminton player. He competed in two events at the 1996 Summer Olympics.

References

1969 births
Living people
Belarusian male badminton players
Olympic badminton players of Belarus
Badminton players at the 1996 Summer Olympics
Place of birth missing (living people)